Mauritanians in France consist of migrants from Mauritania and their descendants living and working in France. They are one of the diasporas from Sub-Saharan Africa in France.

History 
The wave of Mauritanians immigrants began in the 1960s. At that time, France requested immigrants from West Africa (Mauritania, Senegal, Mali, Guinea). A lot of men workers came in France, followed by their wives and children. A few thousands of Mauritanians came in France to work in the automotive industry. But, this wave of immigrants stopped in the 1980s, because of the hardening of immigration policy in France.

Origins 
Most of the Mauritanians are Soninké people from the Senegal River Valley, at the extreme south of Mauritania. There is also a significant number of Mauritanians who are born in France.

Notable people 
 Omar Sy, actor
 Mokobe, singer
 Karim Miske, filmmaker
 Mounir Chouiar

References

Society of France
 
African diaspora in France
Immigration to France by country of origin